Live at the Village Vanguard is an album by Michel Petrucciani. The trio recording was made at the New York club in 1984 and released as a double LP.

Recording and music
The album was recorded in concert at the Village Vanguard in New York City on 16 March 1984. Pianist Petrucciani played with bassist Palle Danielsson and drummer Eliot Zigmund. The material is a mix of standards and previously performed Petrucciani compositions.

Releases and reception

The original release was as a double LP by Concord Jazz. Blue Note Records reissued it on CD.

The AllMusic reviewer's conclusion was: "recommended for lovers of piano trios". The Penguin Guide to Jazz commented that it "captures a typically rumbustious concert set by Petrucciani's trio of the day".

Personnel
Michel Petrucciani – piano
Palle Danielsson – bass
Eliot Zigmund – drums

Track listing
 "Nardis" (Miles Davis) – 11:12
 "Oleo" (Sonny Rollins) – 6:44
 "Le Bricoleur De Big Sur" (Michel Petrucciani) – 3:22 
 "To Erlinda" (Petrucciani) – 11:25
 "Say It Again And Again" (Petrucciani) – 9:51
 "Trouble" (O. Dalffon) – 9:31
 "Three Forgotten Magic Words" (Petrucciani) – 8:56
 "'Round Midnight" (Monk / Williams / Hanighen) – 8.48

Notes 

Michel Petrucciani live albums
1985 live albums
Blue Note Records live albums
Albums recorded at the Village Vanguard